Cool is a surname.

People with the name include:

 Fabien Cool (born 1972), French soccer player
 Kenton Cool (born 1973), British mountaineer
 Wim Cool (born 1943), Dutch politician

See also
 Tré Cool (born 1972, as Frank Edwin Wright III), U.S. drummer from the band Green Day
 Kaul, a surname also spelled as "Cool"
 Mister Cool (disambiguation)
 Cole (surname)
 Cooling (surname)
 Cools (surname)
 McCool (surname)